The Meriti is a river in Rio de Janeiro state in south-eastern Brazil.

It separates the municipalities of Duque de Caxias and São João de Meriti (north) from the state capital of Rio de Janeiro (south). Its mouth is at Guanabara Bay.

The name is of Tupi origin and means "water of the buriti" (from mburi'ti ("buriti") and 'y ("water")).

See also
Maracanã River in Rio de Janeiro city.
List of rivers in Rio de Janeiro state

References

Rivers of Rio de Janeiro (state)
Guanabara Bay
Geography of Rio de Janeiro (city)
Duque de Caxias, Rio de Janeiro